The 2013–14 Los Angeles Lakers season was the 66th season of the franchise, its 65th season in the National Basketball Association (NBA), and its 54th season in Los Angeles. With Dwight Howard's departure to Houston during the offseason, Kobe Bryant playing only six games, and numerous injuries to many of the players, they finished 27–55, the sixth-worst record in the league; it was the most losses in the franchise's history which would change in the 2014–15 season and later the 2015–16 season. The Lakers missed the playoffs for the first time since 2004–05.

The Lakers began the season 10–9. However, they entered the NBA All-Star break with seven straight losses at home, the worst streak in team history. Despite a 13–13 start, they went 14-42 the rest of the way. They were 18–35 and 13 games behind for the eighth and final playoff spot in the Western Conference, and only nine games behind the 9–43 Milwaukee Bucks for the worst record in the league and the best probability of the first overall pick in the NBA draft lottery. On March 6, they lost to the Los Angeles Clippers, their crosstown rivals, 142–94, with the 48-point margin being the most one-sided defeat in Lakers history. It was part of a three-game stretch during which the Lakers allowed an average of 136 points per game, the worst in their history; it matched the most allowed by an NBA team in three games over the past 23 years. Later that month, they were the first team in the league that was eliminated from playoff contention. It was just the third time in 38 seasons that they missed the playoffs. Their .329 winning percentage was the worst since 1957–58, before they had even moved to Los Angeles and when they were still playing in Minneapolis. Lakers players in 2013–14 missed 319 games due to injury, which led the NBA, and the team used 35 different starting lineups. In the final months of the season, the team often dressed just 10 or fewer healthy players, refusing to replace injured players for a few extra wins in a lost season. Following the season, Pau Gasol signed as a free agent with the Chicago Bulls.

Key dates
 June 27: The 2013 NBA draft took place at Barclays Center in Brooklyn, New York.
 July 1: 2013 NBA free agency began.
 December 8: Kobe Bryant plays in first game since tearing his Achilles.
 December 17: Kobe Bryant suffers a broken bone in his knee while playing against the Memphis Grizzlies, but his team went on to beat them, 96–92.
 February 4:  Steve Blake, Jordan Hill, and Jodie Meeks get injured as well as losing against the Minnesota Timberwolves.
 March 14: Following their loss to the San Antonio Spurs the Lakers become eliminated from playoff contention, Thus meaning that for only the sixth time the Lakers won't make the Playoffs.
 March 25: The Lakers hit a franchise record 51 points in one quarter against the New York Knicks, and also a win to the Lakers 96–127.

Draft picks

Roster

Pre-season

|- style="background:#cfc;"
| 1
| October 5
| Golden State
| 
| Xavier Henry (29)
| Chris Kaman (10)
| Jordan Farmar (7)
| Citizens Business Bank Arena6,946
| 1–0
|- style="background:#fcc;"
| 2
| October 6
| Denver
| 
| Xavier Henry (15)
| Robert Sacre (8)
| Steve Blake (7)
| Staples Center16,722
| 1–1
|- style="background:#cfc;"
| 3
| October 8
| Denver
| 
| Steve Blake (16)
| Jordan Hill (12)
| Steve Nash (5)
| Citizens Business Bank Arena6,023
| 2–1
|- style="background:#fcc;"
| 4
| October 10
| Sacramento
| 
| Jodie Meeks (19)
| Kaman & Williams (6)
| Pau Gasol (5)
| MGM Grand Garden Arena10,188
| 2–2
|- style="background:#fcc;"
| 5
| October 15
| Golden State
| 
| Nick Young (18)
| Chris Kaman (10)
| Steve Blake (8)
| MasterCard Center17,114
| 2–3
|- style="background:#fcc;"
| 6
| October 18
| @ Golden State
| 
| Pau Gasol (16)
| Jordan Hill (8)
| Steve Blake (6)
| Mercedes-Benz Arena17,482
| 2–4
|- style="background:#cfc;"
| 7
| October 22
| Utah
| 
| Jordan Farmar (20)
| Gasol, Blake, Johnson (6)
| Nick Young (4)
| Staples Center17,186
| 3–4
|- style="background:#cfc;"
| 8
| October 25
| Utah
| 
| Steve Blake (19)
| Wesley Johnson (9)
| Pau Gasol (7)
| Honda Center14,808
| 4–4

Regular season

Standings

Game log

|- style="background:#cfc;"
| 1
| October 29
| L.A. Clippers
| 
| Xavier Henry (22)
| Pau Gasol (13)
| Jordan Farmar (6)
| Staples Center18,997
| 1–0
|- style="background:#fcc;"
| 2
| October 30
| @ Golden State
| 
| Meeks & Henry (14)
| Gasol & Hill (7)
| Jordan Farmar (5)
| Oracle Arena19,596
| 1–1

|- style="background:#fcc;"
| 3
| November 1
| San Antonio
| 
| Pau Gasol (20)
| Pau Gasol (11)
| Steve Blake (9)
| Staples Center18,997
| 1–2
|- style="background:#cfc;"
| 4
| November 3
| Atlanta
| 
| Xavier Henry (18)
| Pau Gasol (13)
| Steve Blake (7)
| Staples Center18,997
| 2–2
|- style="background:#fcc;"
| 5
| November 5
| @ Dallas
| 
| Nick Young (21)
| Pau Gasol (8)
| Jordan Farmar (7)
| American Airlines Center19,670
| 2–3
|- style="background:#cfc;"
| 6
| November 7
| @ Houston
| 
| Jodie Meeks (18)
| Pau Gasol (12)
| Jordan Farmar (7)
| Toyota Center18,133
| 3–3
|- style="background:#fcc;"
| 7
| November 8
| @ New Orleans
| 
| Chris Kaman (16)
| Jordan Hill (13)
| Steve Blake (8)
| New Orleans Arena18,209
| 3–4
|- style="background:#fcc;"
| 8
| November 10
| Minnesota
| 
| Steve Blake (19)
| Pau Gasol (11)
| Steve Blake (8)
| Staples Center18,997
| 3–5
|- style="background:#cfc;"
| 9
| November 12
| New Orleans
| 
| Jordan Hill (21)
| Jordan Hill (11)
| Steve Blake (10)
| Staples Center18,426
| 4–5
|- style="background:#fcc;"
| 10
| November 13
| @ Denver
| 
| Pau Gasol (25)
| Jordan Hill (15)
| Steve Blake (11)
| Pepsi Center17,824
| 4–6
|- style="background:#fcc;"
| 11
| November 15
| Memphis
| 
| Jodie Meeks (25)
| Pau Gasol (13)
| Steve Blake (10)
| Staples Center18,997
| 4–7
|- style="background:#cfc;"
| 12
| November 17
| Detroit
| 
| Jordan Hill (24)
| Jordan Hill (17)
| Steve Blake (16)
| Staples Center18,997
| 5–7
|- style="background:#cfc;"
| 13
| November 22
| Golden State
| 
| Pau Gasol (24)
| Pau Gasol (10)
| Jordan Farmar (8)
| Staples Center18,997
| 6–7
|- style="background:#cfc;"
| 14
| November 24
| Sacramento
| 
| Xavier Henry (21)
| Jordan Hill (13)
| Steve Blake (12)
| Staples Center18,997
| 7–7
|- style="background:#fcc;"
| 15
| November 26
| @ Washington
| 
| Jordan Farmar (22)
| Jordan Hill (8)
| Gasol & Farmar (8)
| Verizon Center19,204
| 7–8
|- style="background:#cfc;"
| 16
| November 27
| @ Brooklyn
| 
| Nick Young (26)
| Jordan Hill (12)
| Steve Blake (10)
| Barclays Center17,732
| 8–8
|- style="background:#cfc;"
| 17
| November 29
| @ Detroit
| 
| Wesley Johnson (27)
| Pau Gasol (12)
| Steve Blake (10)
| Palace of Auburn Hills15,202
| 9–8

|- style="background:#fcc;"
| 18
| December 1
| Portland
| 
| Xavier Henry (27)
| Shawne Williams (8)
| Steve Blake (9)
| Staples Center18,997
| 9–9
|- style="background:#cfc;"
| 19
| December 6
| @ Sacramento
| 
| Meeks & Gasol (19)
| Jordan Hill (9)
| Steve Blake (10)
| Sleep Train Arena17,317
| 10–9
|- style="background:#fcc;"
| 20
| December 8
| Toronto
| 
| Nick Young (19)
| Bryant, Gasol & Hill (8)
| Bryant & Blake (4)
| Staples Center18,997
| 10–10
|- style="background:#fcc;"
| 21
| December 10
| Phoenix
| 
| Kobe Bryant (20)
| Jordan Hill (7)
| Steve Blake (10)
| Staples Center18,997
| 10–11
|- style="background:#fcc;"
| 22
| December 13
| @ Oklahoma City
| 
| Nick Young (17)
| Robert Sacre (8)
| Kobe Bryant (13)
| Chesapeake Energy Arena18,203
| 10–12
|- style="background:#cfc;"
| 23
| December 14
| @ Charlotte
| 
| Kobe Bryant (21)
| Jordan Hill (9)
| Kobe Bryant (8)
| Time Warner Cable Arena17,101
| 11–12
|- style="background:#fcc;"
| 24
| December 16
| @ Atlanta
| 
| Nick Young (23)
| Pau Gasol (10)
| Kobe Bryant (6)
| Philips Arena15,146
| 11–13
|- style="background:#cfc;"
| 25
| December 17
| @ Memphis
| 
| Bryant & Gasol (21)
| Pau Gasol (9)
| Wesley Johnson (6)
| FedExForum17,217
| 12–13
|- style="background:#cfc;"
| 26
| December 20
| Minnesota
| 
| Nick Young (25)
| Pau Gasol (13)
| Pau Gasol (8)
| Staples Center18,997
| 13–13
|- style="background:#fcc;"
| 27
| December 21
| @ Golden State
| 
| Nick Young (20)
| Chris Kaman (17)
| Jodie Meeks (4)
| Oracle Arena19,596
| 13–14
|- style="background:#fcc;"
| 28
| December 23
| @ Phoenix
| 
| Nick Young (19)
| Henry & Williams (6)
| Jodie Meeks (4)
| US Airways Center14,814
| 13–15
|- style="background:#fcc;"
| 29
| December 25
| Miami
| 
| Nick Young (20)
| Pau Gasol (13)
| Gasol & Meeks (3)
| Staples Center18,997
| 13–16
|- style="background:#fcc;"
| 30
| December 27
| @ Utah
| 
| Nick Young (21)
| Chris Kaman (10)
| Jordan Farmar (7)
| EnergySolutions Arena19,911
| 13-17
|- style="background:#fcc;"
| 31
| December 29
| Philadelphia
| 
| Nick Young (26)
| Jordan Hill (13)
| Jordan Farmar (8)
| Staples Center18,997
| 13–18
|- style="background:#fcc;"
| 32
| December 31
| Milwaukee
| 
| Young & Gasol (25)
| Shawne Williams (11)
| Kendall Marshall (7)
| Staples Center18,997
| 13–19

|- style="background:#cfc;"
| 33
| January 3
| Utah
| 
| Pau Gasol (23)
| Pau Gasol (17)
| Kendall Marshall (15)
| Staples Center18,997
| 14–19
|- style="background:#fcc;"
| 34
| January 5
| Denver
| 
| Pau Gasol (25)
| Pau Gasol (10)
| Kendall Marshall (17)
| Staples Center18,997
| 14–20
|- style="background:#fcc;"
| 35
| January 7
| @ Dallas
| 
| Jodie Meeks (24)
| Pau Gasol (13)
| Kendall Marshall & Jodie Meeks (6)
| American Airlines Center19,656
| 14–21
|- style="background:#fcc;"
| 36
| January 8
| @ Houston
| 
| Nick Young (25)
| Pau Gasol (12)
| Kendall Marshall (8)
| Toyota Center18,229
| 14–22
|- style="background:#fcc;"
| 37
| January 10
| @ L.A. Clippers
| 
| Kendall Marshall (16)
| Pau Gasol (8)
| Kendall Marshall (10)
| Staples Center19,316
| 14–23
|- style="background:#fcc;"
| 38
| January 14
| Cleveland
| 
| Nick Young (28)
| Pau Gasol (12)
| Kendall Marshall (16)
| Staples Center18,997
| 14–24
|- style="background:#fcc;"
| 39
| January 15
| @ Phoenix
| 
| Pau Gasol (24)
| Jordan Hill (10)
| Kendall Marshall (13)
| US Airways Center16,022
| 14–25
|- style="background:#cfc;"
| 40
| January 17
| @ Boston
| 
| Pau Gasol (24)
| Pau Gasol (13)
| Kendall Marshall (14)
| TD Garden18,624
| 15–25
|- style="background:#cfc;"
| 41
| January 19
| @ Toronto
| 
| Nick Young (29)
| Pau Gasol (9)
| Kendall Marshall (11)
| Air Canada Centre17,706
| 16–25
|- style="background:#fcc;"
| 42
| January 20
| @ Chicago
| 
| Nick Young (31)
| Pau Gasol (19)
| Kendall Marshall (8)
| United Center21,626
| 16–26
|- style="background:#fcc;"
| 43
| January 23
| @ Miami
| 
| Jodie Meeks & Pau Gasol (22)
| Pau Gasol (11)
| Kendall Marshall (11)
| American Airlines Arena19,608
| 16–27
|- style="background:#fcc;"
| 44
| January 24
| @ Orlando
| 
| Pau Gasol (21)
| Pau Gasol (11)
| Kendall Marshall (14)
| Amway Center16,101
| 16–28
|- style="background:#fcc;"
| 45
| January 26
| @ New York
| 
| Jodie Meeks (24)
|  Pau Gasol(13)
|  Kendall Marshall(5)
| Madison Square Garden19,812
| 16–29
|- style="background:#fcc;"
| 46
| January 28
| Indiana
| 
| Meeks & Gasol(21)
| Pau Gasol(13)
| Kendall Marshall (13)
| Staples Center18,997
| 16–30
|- style="background:#fcc;"
| 47
| January 31
| Charlotte
| 
| Pau Gasol(24)
| Pau Gasol(9)
| Kendall Marshall (12)
| Staples Center18,997
| 16–31

|- style="background:#fcc;"
| 48
| February 4
| @ Minnesota
| 
| Nick Young (24)
| Wesley Johnson (9)
| Steve Nash (9)
| Target Center12,559
| 16–32
|- style="background:#cfc;"
| 49
| February 5
| @ Cleveland
| 
| Ryan Kelly (26)
| Steve Blake (10)
| Steve Blake (15)
| Quicken Loans Arena15,205
| 17–32
|- style="background:#cfc;"
| 50
| February 7
| @ Philadelphia
| 
| Steve Nash (19)
| Kelly & Kaman (8)
| Kendall Marshall (10)
| Wells Fargo Center15,211
| 18–32
|- style="background:#fcc;"
| 51
| February 9
| Chicago
| 
| Chris Kaman (27)
| Chris Kaman (10)
| Kendall Marshall (11)
| Staples Center18,997
| 18–33
|- style="background:#fcc;"
| 52
| February 11
| Utah
| 
| Chris Kaman (25)
| Chris Kaman (14)
| Steve Blake (8)
| Staples Center18,209
| 18–34
|- style="background:#fcc;"
| 53
| February 13
| Oklahoma City
| 
| Kaman & Johnson (19)
| Chris Kaman (10)
| Kendall Marshall (17)
| Staples Center18,997
| 18–35
|- align="center"
|colspan="9" bgcolor="#bbcaff"|All-Star Break
|- style="background:#fcc;"
| 54
| February 19
| Houston
| 
| Wesley Johnson (24)
| Johnson & Hill (7)
| Kendall Marshall (16)
| Staples Center18,997
| 18–36
|- style="background:#cfc;"
| 55
| February 21
| Boston
| 
| Kaman, Meeks & Gasol (16)
| Jordan Hill (12)
| Kendall Marshall (8)
| Staples Center18,997
| 19–36
|- style="background:#fcc;"
| 56
| February 23
| Brooklyn
| 
| Pau Gasol (22)
| Pau Gasol (11)
| Kendall Marshall (7)
| Staples Center18,997
| 19–37
|- style="background:#fcc;"
| 57
| February 25
| @ Indiana
| 
| Kent Bazemore (23)
| Pau Gasol (9)
| Jordan Farmar (7)
| Bankers Life Fieldhouse18,165
| 19–38
|- style="background:#fcc;"
| 58
| February 26
| @ Memphis
| 
| Jodie Meeks (19)
| Pau Gasol (10)
| Kendall Marshall (8)
| FedExForum16,989
| 19–39
|- style="background:#cfc;"
| 59
| February 28
| Sacramento
| 
| Jordan Farmar (30)
| Wesley Johnson (12)
| Kendall Marshall (10)
| Staples Center18,997
| 20–39

|- style="background:#cfc;"
| 60
| March 3
| @ Portland
| 
| Pau Gasol (22)
| Pau Gasol (9)
| Kendall Marshall (11)
| Moda Center20,013
| 21–39
|- style="background:#fcc;"
| 61
| March 4
| New Orleans
| 
| Pau Gasol (29)
| Pau Gasol (12)
| Kendall Marshall (10)
| Staples Center18,436
| 21–40
|- style="background:#fcc;"
| 62
| March 6
| L.A. Clippers
| 
| Pau Gasol (21)
| Pau Gasol (7)
| Kendall Marshall (7)
| Staples Center18,488
| 21–41
|- style="background:#fcc;"
| 63
| March 7
| @ Denver
| 
| Pau Gasol (25)
| Ryan Kelly (11)
| Kendall Marshall (14)
| Pepsi Center18,248
| 21–42
|- style="background:#cfc;"
| 64
| March 9
| Oklahoma City
| 
| Jodie Meeks (42)
| Pau Gasol (11)
| Kendall Marshall (10)
| Staples Center18,997
| 22–42
|- style="background:#fcc;"
| 65
| March 13
| @ Oklahoma City
| 
| Jodie Meeks (19)
| Kent Bazemore (7)
| Marshall & Kelly (6)
| Chesapeake Energy Arena18,203
| 22–43
|- style="background:#fcc;"
| 66
| March 14
| @ San Antonio
| 
| Pau Gasol (18)
| Pau Gasol (11)
| Kendall Marshall (9)
| AT&T Center18,581
| 22–44
|- style="background:#fcc;"
| 67
| March 19
| San Antonio
| 
| Xavier Henry (24)
| Robert Sacre (11)
| Pau Gasol (6)
| Staples Center18,997
| 22–45
|- style="background:#fcc;"
| 68
| March 21
| Washington
| 
| Meeks & Young (21)
| Gasol & Hill (14)
| Steve Nash (11)
| Staples Center18,112
| 22–46
|- style="background:#cfc;"
| 69
| March 23
| Orlando
| 
| Jordan Hill (28)
| Jordan Hill (13)
| Kent Bazemore (8)
| Staples Center17,803
| 23–46
|- style="background:#cfc;"
| 70
| March 25
| New York
| 
| Xavier Henry (22)
| Chris Kaman (9)
| Kendall Marshall (9)
| Staples Center18,997
| 24–46
|- style="background:#fcc;"
| 71
| March 27
| @ Milwaukee
| 
| Jordan Hill (28)
| Jordan Hill (16)
| Kendall Marshall (7)
| BMO Harris Bradley Center15,439
| 24–47
|- style="background:#fcc;"
| 72
| March 28
| @ Minnesota
| 
| Kent Bazemore (21)
| Hill & Sacre (7)
| Steve Nash (6)
| Target Center16,442
| 24–48
|- style="background:#cfc;"
| 73
| March 30
| Phoenix
| 
| Chris Kaman (28)
| Chris Kaman (17)
| Kendall Marshall (11)
| Staples Center18,355
| 25–48

|- style="background:#fcc;"
| 74
| April 1
| Portland
| 
| Nick Young (40)
| Ryan Kelly (9)
| Steve Nash (10)
| Staples Center18,110
| 25–49
|- style="background:#fcc;"
| 75
| April 2
| @ Sacramento
| 
| Jodie Meeks (21)
| Jordan Hill (15)
| Kendall Marshall (10)
| Sleep Train Arena17,317
| 25–50
|- style="background:#fcc;"
| 76
| April 4
| Dallas
| 
| Jodie Meeks (25)
| Wesley Johnson (11)
| Kendall Marshall (8)
| Staples Center18,997
| 25–51
|- style="background:#fcc;"
| 77
| April 6
| @ L.A. Clippers
| 
| Jordan Hill (22)
| Robert Sacre (10)
| Kendall Marshall (11)
| Staples Center19,239
| 25–52
|- style="background:#fcc;"
| 78
| April 8
| Houston
| 
| Nick Young (32)
| Robert Sacre (6)
| Jordan Farmar (8)
| Staples Center18,131
| 25–53
|- style="background:#fcc;"
| 79
| April 11
| Golden State
| 
| Nick Young (25)
| Jordan Hill (12)
| Young & Hill (4)
| Staples Center18,997
| 25–54
|- style="background:#fcc;"
| 80
| April 13
| Memphis
| 
| Jodie Meeks (20)
| Wesley Johnson (15)
| Kendall Marshall (9)
| Staples Center18,997
| 25–55
|- style="background:#cfc;"
| 81
| April 14
| @ Utah
| 
| Nick Young (41)
| Robert Sacre (9)
| Kendall Marshall (15)
| EnergySolutions Arena19,911
| 26–55
|- style="background:#cfc;"
| 82
| April 16
| @ San Antonio
| 
| Jordan Hill (18)
| Jordan Hill (14)
| Kendall Marshall (11)
| AT&T Center18,581
| 27–55

Player statistics

Regular season

Awards, records and milestones

Awards

Week/Month

All-Star
Kobe Bryant (Did not participate due to injury)

All-NBA

Records

Milestones

Transactions

Additions

Subtractions

See also

 2013–14 NBA season

References

External links
 

Los Angeles Lakers seasons
Los Angeles Lakers
Los Angle
Los Angle